Plounérin is a commune in the Côtes-d'Armor department of Brittany in northwestern France.

Population
Inhabitants of Plounérin are called plounérinais in French.

Breton language
The municipality launched a linguistic plan through Ya d'ar brezhoneg on 29 July 2005.

See also
Communes of the Côtes-d'Armor department

References

External links

Communes of Côtes-d'Armor
Côtes-d'Armor